Sierra Leone competed at the 1992 Summer Olympics in Barcelona, Spain.

Competitors
The following is the list of number of competitors in the Games.

Results by event

Athletics
Men's 800 metres
Prince Amara
 Heat — 1:51.76 (→ did not advance)

Men's 110m Hurdles
 Benjamin Grant 
 Heats — 14.27 (→ did not advance)

Men's Long Jump
Thomas Ganda
 Qualification — 7.67 m (→ did not advance)

Women's Long Jump
 Eunice Barber 
 Heat — 5.55 m (→ did not advance)

References

Sources
Official Olympic Reports

Nations at the 1992 Summer Olympics
1992
Oly